The Roon class was a pair of armored cruisers built for the German Kaiserliche Marine (Imperial Navy) in the 1900s. The Roon class incorporated slight incremental improvements, including a pair of extra boilers. The ships were easily distinguished from their predecessors by the addition of a fourth funnel. Though the additional boilers were meant to increase the ships' speed, both vessels failed to reach their designed top speed. In addition, the ships had comparatively light armament and thin armor protection, so they compared poorly with their foreign contemporaries, particularly the armored cruisers of their primary opponent, the British Royal Navy. 

The two ships served in I Scouting Group, the reconnaissance force of the High Seas Fleet after they entered service in 1905–1906. During this period, Yorck and Roon served stints as the group flagship and the deputy commander flagship, respectively. By the early 1910s, the first German battlecruisers had begun to enter service and Roon was decommissioned in 1911 and placed in reserve; Yorck joined her in 1913. Both ships were reactivated after World War I broke out in July 1914. They were assigned to III Scouting Group, with Roon as its flagship, and tasked with screening for the main body of the German fleet. In November, the German fleet made the raid on Yarmouth, but on return to port at Wilhelmshaven, the fleet encountered heavy fog and had to stop off Schillig. Yorcks commander decided that visibility had improved so he ordered his ship to get underway again, but she quickly struck two German mines and sank with heavy loss of life. 

Roon was transferred to the Baltic in April 1915 and participated in a series of offensive operations against Russian forces, including the attack on Libau in May, the Battle of the Åland Islands in July, and the Battle of the Gulf of Riga in August. The threat of British submarines led to her decommissioning in 1916, after which she was employed as a training ship and an  accommodation vessel. Plans to convert her into a seaplane tender late in the war came to nothing owing to Germany's defeat in 1918, and she was stricken from the naval register in 1920 and broken up the following year.

Design

The Second Naval Law in Germany, passed in 1900, envisioned a force of fourteen armored cruisers for both service overseas in Germany's colonial empire and as scouts for the main battle fleet in German waters. The naval expansion program was primarily directed against the British Royal Navy, then the world's preeminent naval force. The design staff projected that the ships would gain  in speed over the earlier cruisers, but in service, neither actually reached that speed. This failure was primarily the result of their length to breadth ratio, which was the result of limitations imposed by the dock facilities in Wilhelmshaven.

The Roon-class ships shared many of the same layout characteristics as the contemporary German pre-dreadnought battleships, including a smaller main armament but heavier secondary battery than their foreign equivalents. And as with all of the preceding German armored cruisers, they received less armor protection than their opposite numbers in the British fleet. As a result, they compared unfavorably with their British contemporaries. The historian John Taylor describes the ships as "poorly protected and not a successful class in service." Further, they suffered the same fate as many pre-dreadnought type vessels completed in the mid-1900s, having been rendered obsolescent by the advent of all-big-gun warships like the British battlecruiser , launched in 1907.

General characteristics and machinery

Their hulls were constructed from transverse and longitudinal steel frames that formed a structure over which the steel hull plates were riveted. The hulls contained twelve watertight compartments and a double bottom that ran for sixty percent of the length of the ship.

Like the preceding Prinz Adalbert-class ships, Roon and Yorck were good sea boats; when the fuel bunkers were full they had a gentle motion. They also maneuvered well and were responsive to the helm; steering was controlled with a single rudder. With the rudder hard over, the ships lost up to 60 percent speed. The ships' casemates were placed too low, and as a result they were exceedingly wet, which rendered them impossible to use in heavy seas. Their standard complements numbered some 35 officers and 598 enlisted men. While serving as a squadron flagship the crew was augmented by 13 officers and 62 men, and as a second command ship by 9 officers and 44 sailors.

Roon and Yorck were powered by the same engine system as the preceding class, three 3-cylinder vertical triple expansion engines, each of which drove one of the ships' three screws. Steam was provided to the engines by sixteen coal-fired water-tube boilers built by Düsseldorf-Ratinger Röhrenkesselfabrik (Dürr). Each boiler had 4 fireboxes apiece for a total of 48. The boilers were ducted into four funnels. The ships had four turbo generators, which provided 260 kilowatts at 110 volts.

Armament and armor

The ships' primary armament consisted of four  SK L/40 guns mounted in two twin-gun turrets, one fore and one aft. The turrets were the DrL C/01 type turrets, which were hydraulically operated, and the mounts provided a range of elevation from -5 to +30 degrees. The Roon-class ships carried 380 shells for the main battery.

The main battery was supported by a secondary battery of ten  SK L/40 guns in single turrets and casemates clustered amidships. For close-range defense against torpedo boats, the ships carried a tertiary battery of fourteen 8.8 cm SK L/35 guns, which were mounted in individual casemates and pivot mounts in the superstructure. Each ship carried 1,600 rounds for the 15 cm guns, and 2,100 shells for the 8.8 cm guns.

As was customary for warships of the period, the ships were also equipped with four  torpedo tubes. These tubes were submerged in the hull, one in the bow, one in the stern, and one on each broadside.

Roon and Yorck were protected by  Krupp cemented steel armor. At the casemate deck the side armor was also 100 mm thick. The main battery gun turrets were armored with 150 mm thick steel plates on the sides and 30 mm thick roofs. The 15 cm turrets were protected by 100 mm thick sides and 80 mm thick gun shields.

Planned conversion of Roon
In 1918, the design staff prepared plans to convert Roon into a seaplane tender based on earlier conversions that included the light cruiser . By this time, Roon had been disarmed; the proposal involved the installation of a hangar aft of the main superstructure, with equipment to handle four seaplanes. She would have been armed with a battery of six 15 cm L/45 guns and six 8.8 cm Flak guns, though this was never carried out due to the end of the war later that year.

Construction

Service history

On entering service, Yorck joined I Scouting Group, the reconnaissance squadron of the High Seas Fleet. She served as the group flagship for much of her early career, and when Roon joined her in late 1906, the latter vessel became the flagship of the deputy commander (though Roon alternated in this role with the armored cruiser ). In 1907, Roon was detached for a visit to the United States to represent Germany at the Jamestown Exposition. Both vessels made long-distance cruises in the Atlantic in the late 1900s in company with I Scouting Group or the entire High Seas Fleet. Apart from these voyages, the ships were primarily occupied with an uneventful routine of peacetime training exercises. Roon was decommissioned in September 1911, her place in the squadron having been taken by more modern battlecruisers. Yorck was involved in a collision with the torpedo boat  in March 1913 that resulted in the sinking of the latter vessel. Yorck was decommissioned shortly thereafter, with most of her crew being transferred to commission the new battlecruiser .

World War I

Following the outbreak of World War I in July 1914, both cruisers were mobilized and assigned to III Scouting Group, which was initially assigned to the High Seas Fleet in the North Sea; Roon served as the group flagship. Both ships were present in the reconnaissance screen for the High Seas Fleet when it sailed to provide distant support to I Scouting Group during the raid on Yarmouth in November; on returning to Wilhelmshaven on the night of 3 November, the ships encountered heavy fog and were forced to anchor in the Schillig roadstead outside the port to avoid running into the defensive minefields laid outside the harbor. Yorcks commander decided that visibility had improved enough to enter the port, but in the haze he led the ship into one of the minefields. Yorck struck a pair of mines in quick succession and sank with heavy loss of life. Roon continued to operate with the main fleet, taking part in the raid on Scarborough, Hartlepool and Whitby in December. She briefly encountered a pair of British destroyers during the operation, but neither side opened fire.

By early 1915, it had become clear to the German naval command that older vessels like Roon were insufficiently armored to take part in an action with the powerful British Grand Fleet, and so III Scouting Group was transferred to the Baltic Sea in April, where it was dissolved and its ships used to constitute the Reconnaissance Forces of the Baltic, with Roon serving as the deputy commander's flagship. She thereafter took part in a series of offensive operations against Russian forces, beginning with a joint Army-Navy assault on Libau in May. This was followed by several sweeps into the central Baltic in May and June to try to catch Russian vessels, which culminated in the Battle of the Åland Islands in early July; a group of Russian cruisers attacked several German vessels on a minelaying operation and Roon sortied to reinforce the German ships. Roon engaged the Russian armored cruiser  and scored a hit, but was hit several times in return before the Germans disengaged.

Roon participated in the Battle of the Gulf of Riga in August 1915 and bombarded Russian positions at Zerel on the Sworbe Peninsula in company with the armored cruiser . The two cruisers surprised a group of Russian destroyers and damaged one of them before the Russians fled. Roon was disarmed in 1916 and used as a training ship and a floating barracks. Design work commenced in 1916 to convert the ship into a seaplane tender; work was planned to last from 1917 to 1918 during a period of 20 months. The ship was stricken from the naval register on 25 November 1920 and scrapped the following year at Kiel-Nordmole.

Notes

Footnotes

Citations

References

Further reading
 

Cruiser classes
 
World War I cruisers of Germany